The Whitsunday Anglican School (WAS) is an independent Anglican co-educational early learning, primary and secondary day and boarding school, located in Beaconsfield, a suburb in Mackay, Queensland, Australia.

Established in 1988 by the seventh Anglican bishop of North Queensland, The Right Reverend John Lewis SSM, Whitsunday Anglican is the leading academic institution in the Mackay region. The school has a non-selective enrolment policy and currently caters for approximately 900 students from early learning to Year 12, including 80 boarders from Years 5 to 12. It has the highest percentage of students in the top quarter of socio-educational advantage in the region.

The school is affiliated with the Australian Boarding Schools Association (ABSA), the Association of Heads of Independent Schools of Australia (AHISA), the Independent Primary School Heads of Australia (IPSHA), Independent Schools Queensland (ISQ), and the Commonwealth Registar of Institutes and Courses for Overseas Students.

History
The school was established in 1988 by The Right Reverend John Lewis SSM.
The first boarding house (Booth Boarding House) was established in 1988.

International students
Whitsunday Anglican School is the only on-campus boarding school in the Mackay region. This allows WAS to cater to international students on campus. It is also a CRICOS verified school.

See also

 List of boarding schools in Australia
 List of schools in Queensland
 List of Anglican schools in Australia
 List of schools in North Queensland
 List of boarding schools in Australia

References

External links
 The Whitsunday Anglican School website

1988 establishments in Australia
Anglican high schools in Queensland
Boarding schools in Queensland
Anglican primary schools in Queensland
Mackay, Queensland